Nerea Barros Noya (Santiago de Compostela, Spain, May 12, 1981) is a Spanish actress.

Biography 
Nerea Barros was a nurse at the Hospital Clnico de Santiago de Compostela, a job she combined with small roles as a film and theater actress. She made her film debut at the age of sixteen, in 1997, in the film Nena, by the Galician director Xavier Bermúdez, with whom she collaborated again in 2008, in the film Rafael. In 2009, she obtained her first relevant role on the small screen, in Matalobos, broadcast by Televisión de Galicia. It was not, however, until 2013 when she gained some popularity due to her participation in El tiempo entre costuras, Antena 3 series, the adaptation of the novel by María Dueñas.

In 2014, she participated in La isla mínima, in which she played the character of Roco. Her role was awarded the Goya Award for best new actress.

In 2020, she was one of the protagonists in the film La isla de las mentiras, directed by Paula Cons, which tells the fictional story of three heroines who risked their lives to save the passengers of the "Santa Isabel," a ship bound for Argentina that sank off the island of Sálvora in Galicia.

Filmography

Cinema

Television series

Awards

References

External links 
 Nerea Barros on IMDb

Actresses from Galicia (Spain)
Living people
21st-century Spanish actresses
1981 births
Spanish film actresses
Spanish television actresses